Niobe is a 1915 American comedy silent film directed by Hugh Ford and Edwin S. Porter and written by Edward A. Paulton and Harry Paulton based upon their play. The film stars Hazel Dawn, Charles S. Abbe, Maude Odell, Marie Leonard, Reginald Denny and Irene Haisman. The film was released April 4, 1915, by Paramount Pictures.

Plot
This film is based on the Greek story of Niobe. Niobe was the daughter of Tautolus, and the wife of Amphion. Her pride in her children provoked Apollo, who cursed all of them. Niobe was then so overcome with grief, she turned into a stone statue, which gushed fountains of tears. The statue is then bought by Tompkins, an artist, who has it insured by the company of which Peter Amos Dunn is president, who takes the statue to his own home for security purposes.  Electricians, wiring the house, leave live wires at the feet of the statue, and suddenly Niobe steps from her stone pedestal and confronts Dunn. He is at a loss to explain the presence of a goddess to his family. But he remembers that a governess, who sent her trunks to him, is expected in a day or two. Dunn decides to dress up Niobe as the governess and introducing her to his wife and daughters as the actual governess.

Cast  
Hazel Dawn as Niobe
Charles S. Abbe as Peter Amos Dunn
Maude Odell as Caroline Dunn
Marie Leonard as Helen
Reginald Denny as Cornelius Griffin 
Irene Haisman as Beatrice Sillocks
John Merkyl as Tompkins

References

External links 
 

1915 films
1910s English-language films
Silent American comedy films
1915 comedy films
Paramount Pictures films
Films directed by Hugh Ford
Films directed by Edwin S. Porter
American black-and-white films
1910s American films